Frisk may refer to:

 Frisk (confectionery), a product line of breath mint candies
 Frisk (novel), a 1991 novel by Dennis Cooper
 Frisk (film), a 1995 film based on the novel
 Frisk (surname)
 Frisk Asker Ishockey, a Norwegian ice hockey team also known as the "Frisk Tigers"
 Frisk Luft, a Norwegian gospel group
 The Frisk, a punk rock band
 FRISK Software International, an Icelandic software company acquired by Commtouch
 Frisk, the main protagonist in the video game Undertale
 Frisking, a search of a person
 Mr Frisk, a racehorse
 Frisk Radio, a UK radio station.

See also 
 Frisch